New Hampshire Route 87 is a  east–west highway in Rockingham County in southeastern New Hampshire connecting Newfields to Epping. The eastern terminus of NH 87 is in Newfields at its junction with New Hampshire Route 85. The western terminus is in Epping at its junction with New Hampshire Route 125.

Route description 

NH 87 begins in the west at NH 125 in Epping, north of downtown.  The highway proceeds eastward out of town and crosses into Newfields.  NH 87 continues to the town center of Newfields, where it ends at an intersection with NH 85 near the Squamscott River.

In Newfields, the highway is known locally as Piscassic Road.  In Epping, the highway is known locally as Hedding Road.

Junction list

References

External links

087
Transportation in Rockingham County, New Hampshire